Attorney General Vaughan may refer to:

John Henry Vaughan (1892–1965), Attorney General of Zanzibar and Attorney General of Fiji
John Vaughan (Australian politician) (1879–1955), Attorney-General of South Australia

See also
General Vaughan (disambiguation)